Sociedade Esportiva Nacional, commonly known as Nacional, is a Brazilian football club based in Santa Inês, Maranhão state.

History
The club was founded on December 21, 2002. Nacional finished as runners-up in the Campeonato Maranhense Second Level in 2006. Since 2007, the club competes in the Campeonato Maranhense.

Stadium
Sociedade Esportiva Nacional play their home games at Estádio Artemas Santos, nicknamed Binezão. The stadium has a maximum capacity of 9,146 people.

References

Football clubs in Maranhão
Association football clubs established in 2002
2002 establishments in Brazil